Patricia Lee Rubin is an American art historian and a scholar of Italian Renaissance art.

Early life and education
Rubin received her BA from Yale University in 1975, where she was elected to Phi Beta Kappa. She received her MA from the Courtauld Institute of Art, University of London, in 1978, and her Ph.D. from Harvard University in 1986.

Career
Rubin was deputy director at the Courtauld Institute of Art. From 2009 - 2017 she was the Judy and Michael Steinhardt Director at the Institute of Fine Arts, New York University.

Selected publications
Giorgio Vasari. Art and history. Yale University Press, 1995. (won the Eric Mitchell Prize)
Images and identity in fifteenth-century Florence. Yale University Press, 2007.

References 

New York University Institute of Fine Arts faculty
Living people
Year of birth missing (living people)
Alumni of the Courtauld Institute of Art
Harvard University alumni
Academics of the Courtauld Institute of Art
Yale University alumni
American art historians
Women art historians
American women historians
21st-century American women
Women heads of universities and colleges